The following is a list of the 461 communes of the Gers department of France.

The communes cooperate in the following intercommunalities (as of 2020):
Communauté d'agglomération Grand Auch Cœur de Gascogne
Communauté de communes d'Aire-sur-l'Adour (partly)
Communauté de communes Armagnac Adour
Communauté de communes d'Artagnan de Fezensac
Communauté de communes Astarac Arros en Gascogne
Communauté de communes du Bas Armagnac
Communauté de communes Bastides de Lomagne
Communauté de communes Bastides et Vallons du Gers
Communauté de communes Cœur d'Astarac en Gascogne
Communauté de communes des Coteaux Arrats Gimone
Communauté de communes des Deux Rives (partly)
Communauté de communes de la Gascogne Toulousaine (partly)
Communauté de communes du Grand Armagnac
Communauté de communes de la Lomagne Gersoise
Communauté de communes du Savès
Communauté de communes de la Ténarèze
Communauté de communes Val de Gers

References

Gers